The 2018–19 Ohio Bobcats women's basketball team represented Ohio University during the 2018–19 NCAA Division I women's basketball season. The Bobcats, led by sixth year head coach Bob Boldon, played its home games at the Convocation Center in Athens, Ohio as a member of the Mid-American Conference.

They finished the season 30–6, 14–2 in MAC play to win MAC East Division. They advanced to the championship game of the MAC women's tournament where they lost to Buffalo. They received an automatic to the WNIT where defeated High Point, Middle Tennessee and Western Kentucky in the first, second and third rounds before losing to Northwestern in the quarterfinals. With 30 wins, they finished with the most wins in school history.

Offseason

Coaching Staff Changes

Coaching Departures

Coaching Additions

Departures

Incoming transfers

2018 recruiting class

Preseason
The preseason coaches' poll and league awards were announced by the league office on October 31, 2018. Ohio was picked third in the MAC East.

Preseason women's basketball coaches poll
(First place votes in parenthesis)

East Division
 Buffalo (4) 62
 Miami (5) 61
 Ohio (3) 57
 Kent State 28 
 Bowling Green 27 
 Akron 17

West Division
 Central Michigan (12) 72
 Toledo 52
 Eastern Michigan 41
 Northern Illinois 38
 Ball State 34
 Western Michigan 15

Regular Season Champion
Central Michigan (9), Miami (2), Ohio (1)

Tournament champs
Central Michigan (8), Buffalo (3), Northern Illinois (1)

Preseason All-MAC 

Source

Roster

Schedule

|-
!colspan=9 style=| Exhibition

|-
!colspan=9 style=| Non-conference regular season

|-
!colspan=9 style=| MAC regular season

|-
!colspan=9 style=| MAC Women's Tournament

|-
!colspan=9 style=| WNIT

Awards and honors

Weekly Awards

All-MAC Awards

Source

Rankings
2018–19 NCAA Division I women's basketball rankings

See also
2018–19 Ohio Bobcats men's basketball team

References

Ohio
Ohio Bobcats women's basketball seasons
Ohio Bobcats women's basketball
Ohio Bobcats women's basketball
Ohio